Carlos Alberto Hurtado Arteaga (born January 22, 1984, in Zacatepec, Morelos) is a former Mexican professional footballer who last played for Correcaminos UAT. He retired after the 2017–2018 season. He played used to play midfield.

See also
List of people from Morelos, Mexico

External links

1984 births
Living people
Footballers from Morelos
Association footballers not categorized by position
21st-century Mexican people
Mexican footballers